Joe Prichard may refer to:

 Joe Pritchard (American football) (1886–1947), played for the Vanderbilt Commodores
 Joe Pritchard (footballer, born 1943), played for Tranmere Rovers
 Joe Pritchard (footballer, born 1996), plays for Accrington Stanley
 Joe Pritchard, a character from British TV series Shameless

See also
 Joel Pritchard (1925–1997), American politician